Hoseynabad Shahivand (also Romanized as Ḩoseynābād Shāhīvand; also known as Mīrḩoseyn) is a village in Teshkan Rural District, Chegeni District, Dowreh County, Lorestan Province, Iran. At the 2006 census, its population was 65, in 16 families.

References 

Towns and villages in Dowreh County